The 2007–08 Premier League match between Portsmouth and Reading on 29 September 2007, set a record as the highest scoring match in Premier League history. The match was played at Fratton Park in Portsmouth on 29 September 2007. Eleven goals were scored in the match, leaving a final scoreline of 7–4 in Portsmouth's favour. This included six goals during the last twenty minutes of the match, including two scored in injury time.

Match

Summary
With nine different scorers, including an own goal for each side, the match also shares the record for the most goal scorers in a Premier League match, held with Arsenal's 5–4 win at Tottenham Hotspur in 2004–05.

Details

Post-match reaction
"The first half was probably our best 45 minutes this season, but to come in having conceded in the last minute of the half allowed them back in... people say we only play one up front but today proved that it's really three and no-one deserves a hat-trick more than Benji." 
Portsmouth coach Joe Jordan

"It's difficult to analyse a match like that and if you try you will be there a very long time ...we scored four goals away from home and had a chance for another with a penalty. We played a full part in the game - I don't think many teams will come here this season and score four."
Reading manager Steve Coppell

See also
 List of highest-scoring Premier League games

References

2007–08 Premier League
Premier League matches
Reading 2007
Portsmouth 2007
September 2007 sports events in the United Kingdom
2000s in Hampshire